Niklas (born 16 September 1983) is a Danish singer songwriter. He was born in Copenhagen, Denmark, but until he was 13 he lived in Sweden. He became famous with his YouTube renditions "Ingen dikkedarer" in 2010 and "Chiller, når du flexer" in 2011. He was signed to Sony Music and released his first official single "Ikke mer' mig (Niklas f*** dig)" in Sweden and Denmark and is preparing EP1 (on Instant Major record label)

Discography

Singles

Featured in

References

External links
Official website
YouTube
Niklas LastFM

Danish male singers
Danish rappers
People from Copenhagen
1983 births
Living people